Carenum viridiaeneum is a species of ground beetle in the subfamily Scaritinae, found in Australia. It was described by William John Macleay in 1888.

References

viridiaeneum
Beetles described in 1888